Kristy Lee Peters, known professionally as KLP, is an Australian singer, songwriter, record producer, DJ and radio personality from Sydney, New South Wales. Kristy was the host and presenter on Triple J's House Party program from the years 2015 to 2018.

Career
KLP has played a list of festivals and events including: Splendour in the Grass, Field Day (Sydney festival) and Falls Festival. Kristy has written music for and with Skrillex, Slumberjack, Nicole Millar, and Japanese group Banvox.

In May 2020, "Energy" peaked at number 1 on the ARIA club tracks chart as well as being nominated for ARIA Award for Best Dance Release. A Triple J reviewer called the track "A high-intensity club track complete with rave sirens, a deep groove bassline and KLP's signature vocals primed to hype up the club!"

Personal life
Kristy has been in a relationship with Nick Drabble from Set Mo since 2011. Their first child was born in 2019.

Discography

Studio albums

Extended plays

Singles

As lead artist

As featured artist

Notes

Award and nominations

ARIA Music Awards
The ARIA Music Awards is an annual awards ceremony that recognises excellence, innovation, and achievement across all genres of Australian music.

! 
|-
! scope="row"| 2020  
| "Energy" 
| Best Dance Release 
| 
| 
|-
! scope="row"| 2021  
| "People Happy" 
| Best Dance Release 
| 
| 
|}

National Live Music Awards
The National Live Music Awards (NLMAs) are a broad recognition of Australia's diverse live industry, celebrating the success of the Australian live scene. The awards commenced in 2016.

! 
|-
! scope="row"| 2019
| Herself
| Live Electronic Act (or DJ) of the Year
| 
| 
|}

References 

Australian women pop singers
Living people
EMI Records artists
Australian electronic musicians
DJs from Sydney
Women DJs
Australian record producers
Electronic dance music DJs
21st-century Australian women singers
Australian women record producers
Singers from Sydney
Year of birth missing (living people)